William B. Troughear (19 March 1885 – 15 October 1955) was an English footballer who played for Sunderland and Leicester Fosse in the English Football League. He played as a right back.

Life and career
Troughear was born in Workington, Cumberland, in 1885, to Joseph and Emily Troughear. He played football for local clubs Workington Marsh Mission and Workington before signing for Sunderland in 1909. He made his debut in the Football League First Division on 6 November 1909 against Blackburn Rovers in a 0–0 draw at Ewood Park. Troughear made 100 league appearances for Sunderland without scoring, and moved on to Second Division club Leicester Fosse for the 1914–15 season. He later played for Flimby Rangers before returning to Workington. He died in 1955.

References

External links 
Billy Troughear's careers stats at The Stat Cat

1885 births
1955 deaths
Sportspeople from Workington
English footballers
Association football defenders
Workington A.F.C. players
Sunderland A.F.C. players
Leicester City F.C. players
English Football League players
Footballers from Cumbria